DEF II was a programming strand on BBC2, which aired at 6 pm on Mondays and Wednesdays from 9 May 1988 to 23 May 1994, to serve the teenage market. It was produced by Janet Street-Porter, and followed on from her influential youth TV show Network 7 on Channel 4.

Many of the presenters and staff on DEF II started their careers on Network 7 and had followed Street-Porter when she was "poached" by the BBC. It had an ident featuring a barcode which differed from the usual idents used on BBC2.

DEF II shows 

Programmes shown as part of DEF II included both original content, such as Reportage, as well as those from other sources, such as American sitcoms and programmes from Europe (as seen in Jovanotti's Gimme 5.). These included:

See also 
 BBC Switch, BBC Two's second programming block aimed at teenagers

References

External links
Les Lives  at BBC Online Comedy Guide (Internet Archive)
DEF II Revisited on Off The Telly

BBC Television shows
1988 British television series debuts
1994 British television series endings
Television programming blocks in Europe
1980s British teen television series
1990s British teen television series
British music television shows